Gerry Coughlan (23 March 1903 – 6 March 1983) was an Irish middle-distance runner. He competed in the men's 800 metres at the 1928 Summer Olympics.

References

1903 births
1983 deaths
Athletes (track and field) at the 1928 Summer Olympics
Irish male middle-distance runners
Olympic athletes of Ireland
Sportspeople from County Cork
People from Youghal